Trstená na Ostrove is a village and municipality in the Dunajská Streda District in the Trnava Region of south-west Slovakia.

History
The village was first recorded in 1250. Until the end of World War I, it was part of Hungary and fell within the Dunaszerdahely district of Pozsony County. After the Austro-Hungarian army disintegrated in November 1918, Czechoslovak troops liberated the area. After the Treaty of Trianon of 1920, the village became officially part of Czechoslovakia. In November 1938, the First Vienna Award granted the area to Hungary and it was held by Hungary until 1945. The present-day municipality was formed in 1940 by unifying the three component villages. After Soviet occupation in 1945, Czechoslovak administration returned and the village became officially part of Czechoslovakia in 1947.

Demography 
In 1910, the village had 507, for the most part, Hungarian inhabitants. At the 2001 Census the recorded population of the village was 532 while an end-2008 estimate by the Statistical Office had the villages's population as 578. As of 2001, 93,23 per cent of its population was Hungarian while 6,39 per cent was Slovak.

Roman Catholicism is the majority religion of the village, its adherents numbering 74.26% of the total population.

Geography
The municipality lies at an altitude of 116 metres and covers an area of 6.255 km².

References

External links
Local football club info 
Local news selection at www.parameter.hu 
Mestá-Obce.sk 

Villages and municipalities in Dunajská Streda District
Hungarian communities in Slovakia